Clothes Make the Man is a 1915 American film featuring Oliver Hardy based on the novella Kleider machen Leute by the Swiss author Gottfried Keller from 1874.

Cast
 Raymond McKee as Harold
 Yale Benner as Kearney
 Jean Dumar as Ethel
 Oliver Hardy as Rastus (as O.N. Hardy)
 Guido Colucci as George
 Maxine Brown as Sarah
 James Harris as Mr. Clancey
 Alice Grey as Phoebe Snow

See also
 List of American films of 1915
 Oliver Hardy filmography

References

External links

1915 films
American silent short films
Silent American comedy films
American black-and-white films
1915 comedy films
1915 short films
American comedy short films
Films based on works by Gottfried Keller
1910s American films